The  refers to the controversial forced resignation of Kume Kunitake from the University of Tokyo in Japan during the Meiji Era (1868 - 1912). The controversy was centered around Kunitake's analysis of historic documents retracing the mythological foundation of Japan. In the October 1891 edition of Shigaku zasshi, he argued that Shinto is an outdated religious belief; an assertion that shook the Meiji establishment, whose State Shinto was based in the divine origin of the emperor.

Bibliography 
 John S. Brownlee, Japanese Historians and the National Myths, 1600-1945: The Age of the Gods and Emperor Jinmu, University of British Columbia Press, 1999, pp. 92–106
 Margaret Mehl, Scholarship and Ideology in Conflict: The Kume Affair, 1892, in Monumenta Nipponica, volum 48, n°3, 1993, pp. 337–357

University of Tokyo
Controversies in Japan
1892 in Japan

Anti-nationalism